Dundee Community Schools is a public school district in Dundee, Michigan.  The district includes all of the Village of Dundee; most of Dundee Township, parts of which are served by the Britton-Macon, Summerfield and Ida public school districts; the westernmost portion of Raisinville Township; part of southwestern Exeter Township, including a small westerly strip of the Village of Maybee; and the southerly portions of London and Milan townships.  The district consists of four schools on one main campus just north of M-50, with the alternative school located several blocks away.

Schools

Elementary schools
Dundee Elementary School

Secondary schools
Dundee Middle School
Dundee High School

Alternative schools
Riverside Academy

Educational activities
Dundee High School is home to FIRST Robotics Competition Team 4395, the Dundee Vi-Borgs.

Athletics
Dundee Schools are most known for its Wrestling program. Dundee High School wrestling has been a top program in the state of Michigan since 1995, where they won the first of four consecutive Division 4 State Wrestling Championships, leading into a historic performance in 2000-2001 where the Vikings were said to be the best team in the state of Michigan in all Divisions. In 2002-03 the Vikings moved into Division 3 with the growth of the school district and have continued the success they had in Division 4. The Dundee Vikings Wrestling team has won 14 MHSAA State Championships, winning states in 1995, 1996, 1997, 1998, 2001, 2007, 2013, 2014, 2016, 2018, 2019, 2020, 2021, and 2022.  Their head coach, Tim Roberts, was named the NWCA National High School Wrestling coach of the year in 2020.

In addition to the team success, Dundee has also produced many Individual State Wrestling Champions. Here is a comprehensive list of Dundee's individual state champions according to Michigan Grappler, which received its information directly from the Dundee Wrestling staff and the Michigan High School Athletic Association.

Dundee Wrestling Individual State Champs

1977: Mark Rigel, Eugene Aguirre

1982: Steve Rowe

1993: Ryon Orrison

1995: Pat Motylinski

1996: Tim Homrich

1997: Chad Wagner

1998: Jacob Davis, Chad Wagner

2000: Scott Miller

2001: Andy Salenbien, Brandon Jonseck

2002: Cosell Beavers

2003: Cosell Beavers

2004: Cosell Beavers

2005: Martin Rusek, Adam MacIver

2007: Pete Rendina

2008: Chris Eggert, Jimmy Rowe

2009: Nate Jaworski, Pete Rendina

2010: Chris Rau, Joe Rendina, Justin Heiserman

2011: Joey White, Joe Rendina, Chris Rau, Justin Heiserman

2013: Doug Rojem, Teddy Warren, John Marogen

2015: Brandon Whitman

2016: Sean Sterling, Brandon Whitman

2017: Zach Bellaire, Tylor Orrison, Sean Sterling, Brandon Whitman

2018: Stoney Buell, Brandon Whitman

2019: Casey Swiderski, Jonathon White, Stoney Buell

2020: Braeden Davis, Austin Fietz, Casey Swiderski, Christian Killion, Tyler Swiderski, Dominick Lomazzo, Stoney Buell

References

External links
Dundee Community Schools

School districts in Michigan
Education in Monroe County, Michigan